Wrap Your Arms Around Me is the first English-language solo studio album by Swedish singer and ABBA member Agnetha Fältskog, and her seventh studio album overall. It was released by Polar Music on 31 May 1983 and was produced by Mike Chapman. "The Heat Is On", "Wrap Your Arms Around Me" and "Can't Shake Loose" were released as singles to promote the album. In 2005, the album was re-released in CD format with five bonus tracks.

Singles and commercial performance
The first track from the album, "The Heat Is On", was issued as a single in Europe, where it is commonly regarded as Fältskog's best-known 1980s solo hit. "The Heat Is On" was successful in Europe and Scandinavia, reaching number one in Sweden and Norway and peaking at number two in the Netherlands and Belgium. The album's title track was another successful single, topping the charts in Belgium and Denmark, reaching the top 5 in Sweden, the Netherlands and South Africa, and the top 20 in Germany and France. "Can't Shake Loose" was the choice for the lead single in North America; this song became the first of only two solo singles from Fältskog to chart on the Billboard Hot 100 in the United States, peaking at number 29 in October 1983. The song was written by Russ Ballard, who also wrote "I Know There's Something Going On", the only US hit by Fältskog's fellow ABBA member, Frida.

The track "Man" was the only song on the album written by Fältskog herself, in contrast to her pre-ABBA 1960s recordings in Swedish, which were mostly self-written. The album's strings were provided by the Swedish Radio Symphony Orchestra.

The album has sold over 1.2 million copies worldwide.

Critical reception

The album received favorable reviews from music critics. Joe Viglione from AllMusic retrospectively gave the album four out of five stars and wrote that songs like "The Heat Is On" and "Shame" were "much more refined than a lot of the dreck the major labels were issuing at the time" and that the album is "a healthy serving of charming melodies". He mentioned that the composition, "like the album, is a real gem". The contemporary review from People magazine was also favorable, the author wrote that the record is like the ABBA albums "smooth, upbeat, relentlessly bright and on the sterile side". He concluded that fans of ABBA will not dislike the record and people who dislike the group will not like it any better.

Track listing

Charts

Weekly charts

Year-end charts

References

Bibliography

 

1983 albums
Agnetha Fältskog albums
Albums produced by Mike Chapman
Polar Music albums